The canton of Causse-Comtal is an administrative division of the Aveyron department, southern France. It was created at the French canton reorganisation which came into effect in March 2015. Its seat is in Sébazac-Concourès.

It consists of the following communes:
Agen-d'Aveyron
Bozouls
Gabriac
La Loubière
Montrozier
Rodelle
Sébazac-Concourès

References

Cantons of Aveyron